Soyuz TMA-14M was a 2014 flight to the International Space Station. It transported three members of the Expedition 41 crew to the International Space Station. TMA-14M is the 123rd flight of a Soyuz spacecraft, the first flight launching in 1967. The Soyuz remained docked to the space station for the Expedition 42 increment to serve as an emergency escape vehicle until undocking and landing as scheduled in March 2015.

Crew

Backup crew

Mission highlights

Launch, rendezvous and docking
Soyuz TMA-14M successfully launched aboard a Soyuz-FG rocket from the Baikonur Cosmodrome in Kazakhstan at 20:25 UTC on Thursday, 25 September 2014 (2:25 AM Friday 26 September local time). The spacecraft reached low Earth orbit approximately nine minutes after lift-off. After reaching orbit, the Soyuz spacecraft's port solar array failed to deploy, but eventually did deploy after docking with the ISS. According to NASA and the Russian Federal Space Agency, the solar array does not pose a threat to the success of the mission.

Following a four-orbit rendezvous, the spacecraft docked with the Poisk module of the International Space Station just under six hours after launch, at 02:11 UTC on Friday, 26 September. Hatches between the two spacecraft were opened at 04:06 UTC. At this time, the crew of TMA-14M joined the crew of Expedition 41, where they were scheduled to remain until the crew of Soyuz TMA-13M departed in November 2014. Samokutyayev, Serova and Wilmore transferred to the crew of Expedition 42 at that time.

Undocking and return to Earth
TMA-14M remained docked to the ISS—serving as an emergency escape vehicle—until March 11, 2015, when it departed and returned Samokutyayev, Serova and Wilmore to Earth. After undocking from the ISS at 22:44 UTC on 11 March, the spacecraft deorbited and its descent module along with the mission crew landed safely just over three hours later, at 02:07 UTC on 12 March.

Gallery

In media
 In the 2014 film Gravity, STS-157 Mission Specialist Dr. Ryan Stone pilots the damaged Soyuz TMA-14M spacecraft in her travel from the ISS to the Chinese Tiangong-1 station and is able to hack the computer to separate the modules and activate the landing retrorockets in space as the capsule is out of fuel.

References

Crewed Soyuz missions
Spacecraft launched in 2014
2014 in Russia
Spacecraft which reentered in 2015
Spacecraft launched by Soyuz-FG rockets